The Obinitsa Church of Transfiguration of Our Lord is a church belonging to the Estonian Apostolic Orthodox Church in Obinitsa, Estonia.

History
The building of the former Obinitsa School-Church was constructed in 1897 and was inaugurated in 1904. The school-church, unique in the Baltics, was a wooden two-storied building with a bell tower. In 1950, the church was closed and the building given to the school. This action was based in Soviet anti-religious legislation that separated church and state and forced the handover of religious properties to the state. This activity was based on a written regulation from the former chairman of the Estonian SSR Council of Ministers, Arnold Veimer, to the chairman of the Meremäe rural municipality Executive Committee.

The congregation of the closed church was given one hectare of land and two old abandoned buildings for a new church. The new Obinitsa church is next to the cemetery by the road leading from Obinitsa to Piusa. In 1950, local priest Vilemon Talomees, supported by the local community, began building a new church. At first, he worked alone; then  congregation members joined him. The Võru County deanery did not support the building, as they were busy building Meeksi Church.

On January 9, 1952, interior decorating began. Valga Church gave the Obinitsa congregation the assets from Tõrva Church (church bell, icons, chandelier, candle sticks, altar, and service clothes for the priest). Large donations of building materials came from local farmers. Material support was provided by the Bishopric of Estonia.

The church, still surrounded by scaffolding, was inaugurated on June 15, 1952, by Bishop Roman of Tallinn  in honour of Transfiguration of Our Lord. On October 27, 1953, Bishop Roman gave Vilemon Talomees a letter of thanks for his selflessness and self-sacrifice in applying all his skills, will, and workforce into building a handsome new church and presbytery, with outbuildings for the Obinitsa congregation. The Holy Patriarch, who awarded him the right to wear a badge of distinction, appreciated his work.

References

Eastern Orthodox churches in Estonia
Setomaa Parish
Buildings and structures in Võru County
Churches completed in 1952
1952 establishments in Estonia